Manganokhomyakovite is a very rare mineral of the eudialyte group, with the chemical formula . This formula is in extended form (based on the original one), to show the presence of cyclic silicate groups and domination of silicon at the M4 site, basing on the nomenclature of the eudialyte group. Some niobium substitutes for tungsten in khomyakovite. As suggested by its name, manganokhomyakovite is a manganese-analogue of khomyakovite, the latter being more rare. The two minerals are the only group representatives, beside taseqite, with species-defining strontium, although many other members display strontium diadochy. Manganokhomyakovite is the third eudialyte-group mineral with essential tungsten (after johnsenite-(Ce) and khomyakovite).

Occurrence and association
Manganokhomyakovite, khomyakovite, johnsenite-(Ce) and oneillite are four eudialyte-group minerals discovered in alkaline rocks of Mont Saint-Hilaire, Quebec, Canada. Association of manganokhomyakovite is rich and includes: aegirine, albite, analcime, annite, kupletskite, microcline, natrolite, sodalite, titanite, wöhlerite, zircon, cerussite, galena, molybdenite, pyrite, pyrrhotite, and sphalerite.

Notes on chemistry
Impurities in manganokhomyakovite include niobium and  iron, with traces of rare earth elements, hafnium, titanium, tantalum, and aluminium.

References

Cyclosilicates
Sodium minerals
Strontium minerals
Calcium minerals
Manganese minerals
Zirconium minerals
Tungsten minerals
Trigonal minerals
Minerals in space group 160